Sociology is a Martial Art (original title in French La sociologie est un sport de combat) is a French documentary film released in 2001, directed by Pierre Carles and conceived by the latter as an attempt to make sociology known, and more particularly the work of sociologist Pierre Bourdieu.

Synopsis
Sociology is a Martial Art shows how Pierre Bourdieu works, “thinking in action” and what the daily life of a sociologist is made of. To date, the work has never been broadcast on French television.

Technical sheet
Director: Pierre Carles
Producer: Véronique Frégosi and Annie Gonzalez
Production company: CP Productions and VF Films
Distribution company: Cara M.
Editor: Virginie Charifi, Youssef Charifi, Claire Painchault and Bernard Sasia
Type: Documentary
Duration: 2 h 26
Release date: May 2, 2001

Featuring
Pierre Bourdieu
Loïc Wacquant
Serge Halimi
Daniel Mermet
Rémi Lenoir
Patrick Champagne
Edward Said

Bibliography 
Gérôme Truc, "When sociologists make their cinema: Cross analysis of Sociology is a combat sport and the journey of a sociologist", Conversely, vol.  2,2004, p. 44-66.

References

External links

Documentary in Vimeo https://vimeo.com/92709274
Film's page in Icarus Film http://icarusfilms.com/if-socio

French documentary films
Pierre Bourdieu
2001 films
2000s French films